Maria Stein (German, literally Mary's stone or "Mary of the Rock") is an unincorporated community in central Marion Township, Mercer County, Ohio, United States. The community and the Maria Stein Convent lie at the center of the area known as the Land of the Cross-Tipped Churches, where a missionary priest, Father Francis de Sales Brunner, established a number of parishes for German Catholics.

Notable features
Situated in southern Mercer County, Maria Stein is a rural farming community with a history dating to the early 19th century. The residents of the community and its surrounding region, nicknamed the "Land of the Cross-Tipped Churches", have largely German Catholic roots. It was settled in the early 19th century by immigrants from Germany who cleared the dense forests of the region and uncovered a rich and productive farmland. Multi-generation families have prospered through their management of the rich, dark soil of the region. In the character of small communities, churches provide the framework for social interaction. Holidays such as Easter and Christmas are community celebrations, shared by most citizens.

History
The community of St. Johns was established in 1833. Its name was selected because all of its early male settlers bore the name of John. When the Cincinnati, Hamilton, and Dayton Railway expanded through Mercer County some years later, its surveyors chose a path through the small community of Maria Stein, to the west of St. Johns. As these two communities were separated by only , business interests migrated to the vicinity of the railroad, and the two communities eventually merged under the name of Maria Stein.

The origin of the name "Maria Stein" is likely from Metzerlen-Mariastein in Switzerland. This small community, not so far from Basel, has a Benedictine abbey, Mariastein Abbey. Father Francis de Sales Brunner, who established the Missionaries of the Precious Blood order that provides priests for St John's Church in Maria Stein, Ohio, entered the abbey in 1812 and remained there as a member of the convent until 1829. Although there is no written evidence that it was Father Brunner who named the town of Maria Stein, the erection of a large church and the Shrine of the Holy Relics in Maria Stein is supportive. According to an article by Father Lukas Schenker of Mariastein Abbey, Brunner probably named the convent at Maria Stein after Mariastein Abbey in Switzerland because Brunner donated a painted depiction of the Miraculous Madonna of Mariastein to the convent, after which also the town was named. It is said of this painting that Brunner had it with him when crossing the English Channel in a sailing vessel and was miraculously saved from shipwreck in a bad storm.

The historical character of Maria Stein and many other similar communities is evident in their most notable feature, their churches. In this region, every small crossroads community has a substantial church, typically constructed by immigrant German craftsmen in the mid- to late nineteenth century and characterized by a steeple topped with a cross. The churches in Minster, St. Henry, and Maria Stein are the largest examples, but others are found in St. Rose, Cassella, St. Sebastian, and Osgood. St. John's Church in Maria Stein was built in 1889.

Influence of the Miami and Erie Canal on development
The development of Maria Stein was also influenced by the creation of the Miami and Erie Canal. In the early 19th century, there were few roads and mass transportation to the region occurred on waterways such as the Great Lakes, the Ohio River and smaller tributaries. Recognizing the impact that the Erie Canal in New York State had on its development, the Ohio Legislature in approximately 1825 authorized the digging of two canals, one in the eastern part of the state (the Ohio Canal) and a second, the Miami and Erie Canal, in the western portion of the state, both connecting Lake Erie with the Ohio River. Over the next 20–30 years the Miami and Erie Canal gradually took shape as segments were dug and pieced together to create a canal spanning the entire distance between Toledo and Cincinnati. Initially the canal provided a source of cash for workers who dug the canal. This enabled them to pay down the loans on their farms, purchased from the government for $1 per acre. The canal also provided a route for immigrants to reach Maria Stein. After its completion it provided transportation for farm goods to developing urban centers in Toledo and Lake Erie to the north and Dayton, Cincinnati and points further down stream on the Ohio and Mississippi rivers to the south and fostered the development of railheads to connect with the canal, facilitating the industrial development of the surrounding region. Many farmers in Maria Stein and surrounding towns worked on their farms and held a second job in one of the many surrounding manufacturing plants. This enabled them to weather the cyclical nature of farm revenue and create a prosperous hybrid rural-manufacturing economy. Maria Stein has remained almost entirely a farm-based community because of its lack of a canal or railroad (following closure of the CH&DRR in 1917) to transport manufactured goods to market, whereas surrounding communities, Minster, New Bremen, Celina and St. Marys had either railways or the canal and as a result developed robust manufacturing businesses. This trend is evidenced by movement of the New Idea Farm Machinery factory to Coldwater, OH following the railroad closure.

Unique aspects
Perhaps the defining feature of this rural community is its Roman Catholicism. In a pattern reminiscent of Central Europe following the 30 years war in the 17th century, the smaller communities in northwest Ohio developed along religious lines. A preponderance of citizens in New Bremen and New Knoxville are Protestant, whereas Maria Stein and the surrounding communities of Minster, Fort Loramie, Chickasaw, St. Rose, Cassella, Egypt, Sebastian, Montezuma, and St. Henry are almost entirely Roman Catholic. This did not happen by chance. As Professor Wolfgang Fleischhauer, a German linguist from the Ohio State University pointed out in his treatise on this subject "the immigrants of each community came from one, usually a small district in the homeland and they were held together by the ties of kinship, religion, common history and speech." He further adds that "The settlers of the Northwestern Ohio communities with which we are concerned emigrated from the Northwest of Germany, Westphalia and Oldenburg, especially its Southern part, the " Oldenburger Münsterland, predominantly Catholic, with strong historical and spiritualties to the old Bishopric of Münster." Another feature, highlighted by Professor Fleischhauer, was the creation of insular communities by the utilization of a unique region- and religion-specific dialect that was adopted by local Protestants or Catholics. Protestants from New Knoxville speak a Low German dialect that is indistinguishable from the dialect from Ladbergen, Germany, where many of its residents derived. Citizens of Minster and Fort Loramie (and Maria Stein), although they live close to the town of New Knoxville, speak a Low German dialect with subtle but definite differences. Both dialects are derived from the northwestern German regions of Westphalia, Lower Saxony and Southern Oldenburg. Furthermore, these dialects have remained pure. A comparison by Professor Fleischhauer of dialects in Germany from the 1850s to dialects in these towns in the 1970s showed no appreciable difference between the mother dialect and the current dialects with the exception of modern words introduced after emigration from Germany such as airplane, automobile, phonograph, and compact discs. These new English words are conveniently inserted into the local Ohio dialect. Even now there are families, usually those in which both parents are of a German lineage, in which this dialect is still spoken on a regular basis and owners of businesses who speak the dialect may conduct business with it on occasion. This rigid demarcation of a dialect is called an "isogloss" and is remarkable given the almost 200 years that have passed since these villages were first settled. High German was taught in the local schools until it became unpopular during the period of the first and second world wars.

Shrine of the Holy Relics Chapel

A notable feature of Maria Stein is the Shrine of the Holy Relics. Relics include body parts (usually bones) from saints or objects that belonged to a saint; they are held in high respect because they were individuals who led exemplary lives. Father Francis de Sales Brunner, the missionary who led the "Missionaries of the Precious Blood" order of priests, was a collector of relics, and he was responsible for the first collection of relics in Maria Stein. During the 19th century other relics were added to the core collection as a way of protecting them from the continuous strife between city states of 19th-century Italy. In 1892 a separate "relic chapel" was established in which Sisters of the Precious Blood conducted a continuous vigil. The collection of relics is the second largest in the United States.

The Sacred Heart Relic Chapel is a kaleidoscope of color, 18th and 19th-century German carving, and relics distributed throughout. The "relic chapel" is connected to a larger chapel that in turn is the central feature of a 19th-century brick convent. A 2007 segment on National Public Radio describes this unique collection of relics. These relics include a splinter of the true cross and a splinter of bone from St. Peregrine, the patron saint of patients with cancer. The shrine was placed on the National Register of Historic Places in 1976. The Heritage Museum on the second floor of the convent showcases life during the early years of the community. Even today southern Mercer County is predominantly Catholic, a reflection of 19th-century immigration patterns.

Architecture and geographical organization
Another notable feature is the architecture and organizational infrastructure of Marion Township and the surrounding region. The region is characterized by 40-80 acre farms laid out in the characteristic one-half-mile grid divided by four in which the house and barn characteristically sit somewhere in the middle of each sixteenth or eighth mile section. This organizational layout derived from the creation of 40-80 acre farms in the early 19th century to entice immigrants to settle on the newly pacified frontier. Immigrants paid approximately $1 per acre for the land. Many of these farms have remained in the original settlers' families, although economic trends favoring larger farms have led to consolidation during the past 40–50 years. The farmhouses demonstrate several unique styles that show their Germanic roots. Farms are neat and orderly and indicative of the organization and prosperity of the largely German-derived population.

A German dialect, traced by linguist Professor Wolfgang Fleischhauer of Ohio State University to northwest Germany (almost Dutch), is still spoken by many members of the community.

Recreation
The lake is located at the peak of the north-south watershed. The lake has benefited from the Clean Water Act and there has been a resurgence of recreational use over the past 2 decades following improvement in water quality. Many keep fishing or motorized boats at the lake. The closest movie theaters are in New Bremen and Celina. Approximately  from Maria Stein near the intersection of State Route 127 and State Route 119 is Starlight Drive-In, one of the few remaining drive-in theaters in the state.

There are a variety of country festivals that take place throughout the region during the summer. In late June each year the community hosts the Maria Stein Country Fest, a weekend event that celebrates the rural and religious roots of this small community. The fest is held on the grounds of the Maria Stein Shrine of the Holy Relics. The highlight of the event is tractor square dancing, an event in which four pairs of tractors participate in a precise replica of a square dance. Maria Stein's cultural and religious history is remembered with a pilgrimage from St. John's Catholic Church, a quarter mile away, to the relic chapel grounds. This is a parade with participation by the Knights of St John, an ancient uniformed religious guard, and members of the American Legion.

Notable people
In 1899, Joseph Oppenheim, the inventor of the first mechanized manure spreader, established the New Idea Spreader in Maria Stein. His sons and his son-in-law, Henry Synck, also a resident of Maria Stein, subsequently moved New Idea to Coldwater. Maria Stein is also home to Pittsburgh Pirates relief pitcher Cory Luebke, who retired from baseball in May, 2017.

School
Maria Stein is home to Marion Local High School, part of the Marion Local school district. The student body is derived from the communities of Maria Stein, St Rose, Casella, Chickasaw, St Sebastian, and Osgood.

Notes

External links
 Shrine of the Holy Relics Museum
 Marion Local Communities

 
German-American culture in Ohio
Unincorporated communities in Mercer County, Ohio
Unincorporated communities in Ohio